The Alberta Regional Network also known as the ARN was an electronic networking organization in Alberta that links Alberta Credit Unions with ATB Financial.  It was disbanded in 2010, concurrently with the introduction of chip cards in Canada.

Benefits
Customers of ARN members could use credit union and ATB financial ATMs to pay bills, inquire accounts, and deposit money with any other member institution without having to pay fees.

References

Banking in Canada
Interbank networks
Companies disestablished in 2010